John R. Dutcher is a Canadian physicist.

Dutcher completed a co-op degree in engineering and physics at Dalhousie University in 1983, then chose to specialize in condensed matter physics, earning a master's degree in the subject at the University of British Columbia before obtaining a doctorate at Simon Fraser University. His laboratory at the University of Guelph researches soft matter and biological physics. Dutcher was granted a Tier I Canada Research Chair in 2006. In 2007, Dutcher was elected a fellow of the American Physical Society,"[f]or fundamental contributions to the understanding of polymers at the nanoscale; particularly to the development of novel experimental techniques for the study of ultrathin films."

References

1961 births
Living people
20th-century Canadian physicists
21st-century Canadian physicists
University of British Columbia alumni
Dalhousie University alumni
Canada Research Chairs
Fellows of the American Physical Society
Simon Fraser University alumni
Academic staff of the University of Guelph